Isaac Farchi Sultán (born 12 June 1960) is an international businessman and a politician. He is the son of the businessman Nissim Farchi Finkelstain, an Israeli born in Bulgaria, and Vilma Sultan Berchowitz, a Guatemalan of Israeli origin. Farchi was the first Jew to hold a public office in Guatemala. He ran as presidential candidate in the 2019 elections, Farchi won fifth place. He is currently the Government Commissioner for Investment and Tourism of Guatemala.

References

Living people
Guatemalan Jews
Guatemalan politicians
1960 births